Pleistocene megafauna is the set of large animals that lived on Earth during the Pleistocene epoch. Pleistocene megafauna became extinct during the Quaternary extinction event resulting in substantial changes to ecosystems globally. The role of humans in causing Pleistocene megafaunal extinctions is controversial.

Pleistocene megafauna include the straight-tusked elephant, cave bear (Ursus spelaeus), interglacial rhinoceros (Stephanorhinus), heavy-bodied Asian antelope (Spirocerus), Eurasian hippopotamuses, woolly rhinoceros, mammoths, giant deer, sabre-toothed cat (Homotherium), cave lion, and the leopard in Europe.

Paleoecology

The last glacial period, commonly referred to as the 'Ice Age', spanned 125,000 to 14,500 years ago and was the most recent glacial period within the current ice age which occurred during the final years of the Pleistocene epoch. The Ice Age reached its peak during the last glacial maximum, when ice sheets commenced advancing from 33,000 years BP and reached their maximum positions 26,500 years BP. Deglaciation commenced in the Northern Hemisphere approximately 19,000 years BP, and in Antarctica approximately 14,500 years BP which is consistent with evidence that this was the primary source for an abrupt rise in the sea level 14,500 years ago.

A vast mammoth steppe stretched from the Iberian peninsula across Eurasia and over the Bering land bridge into Alaska and the Yukon where it was stopped by the Wisconsin glaciation. This land bridge existed because more of the planet's water was locked up in glaciation than now and therefore the sea levels were lower. When the sea levels began to rise this bridge was inundated around 11,000 years BP. During the last glacial maximum, the continent of Europe was much colder and drier than it is today, with polar desert in the north and the remainder steppe or tundra. Forest and woodland was almost non-existent, except for isolated pockets in the mountain ranges of southern Europe.

The fossil evidence from many continents points to the extinction mainly of large animals at or near the end of the last glaciation. These animals have been termed the Pleistocene megafauna. Scientists frequently define megafauna as the set of animals with an adult body weight of over 45 kg (or 99 lbs). Across Eurasia, the straight-tusked elephant became extinct between 100,000 and 50,000 years BP. The cave bear (Ursus spelaeus), interglacial rhinoceros (Stephanorhinus), heavy-bodied Asian antelope (Spirocerus), and the Eurasian hippopotamuses died out between 50,000 and 16,000 years BP. The woolly rhinoceros and mammoths died out between 16,000 and 11,500 years BP. The giant deer died out after 11,500 BP with the last pocket having survived until about 7,700 years BP in western Siberia. A pocket of mammoths survived on Wrangel Island until 4,500 years BP. As some species became extinct, so too did their predators. Among the top predators, the sabre-toothed cat (Homotherium) died out 28,000 years BP, the cave lion 11,900 years BP, and the leopard in Europe died out 27,000 years BP. The Late Pleistocene was characterized by a series of severe and rapid climate oscillations with regional temperature changes of up to 16 °C, which has been correlated with megafaunal extinctions. There is no evidence of megafaunal extinctions at the height of the LGM, indicating that increasing cold and glaciation were not factors. Multiple events appear to also involve the rapid replacement of one species by one within the same genus, or one population by another within the same species, across a broad area.

The ancestors of modern humans first appeared in East Africa 195,000 years ago. Some migrated out of Africa 60,000 years ago, with one group reaching Central Asia 50,000 years ago. From there they reached Europe, with human remains dated to 43,000-45,000 years BP discovered in Italy, Britain, and in the European Russian Arctic dated to 40,000 years ago. Another group left Central Asia and reached the lower Yana River, Siberia, well above the Arctic circle, 27,000 years ago. Remains of mammoth that had been hunted by humans 45,000 YBP have been found at Yenisei Bay in the central Siberian Arctic. Modern humans then made their way across the Bering land bridge and into North America between 20,000 and 11,000 years ago, after the Wisconsin glaciation had retreated but before the Bering land bridge became inundated by the sea. However, there remains no consensus among scholars on the timing of human migration into the Americas. In the Fertile crescent the first agriculture was developing 11,500 years ago.

Ecological consequences of megafaunal extinctions

Community and ecosystem changes 
Megafauna extinctions resulted in global changes to ecosystem structure and function. Extinction of megafauna broadly restructured ecological communities and species interactions. The extinction of megafauna affected mutualist species, resulting in co-extinctions. Evidence from fossil pollen indicates that megafaunal extinctions may have resulted in the development of novel plant communities, and altered fire regimes on a global scale. Some evidence, however, suggests that vegetation changes preceded megafaunal extinctions.

Pleistocene grazers limited wildfire by consuming biomass in grassland ecosystems; the decline of these grazers increased grassland fire frequency. Some hypothesize that forbs in modern grasslands are adapted to disturbance by large herbivores on former mammoth steppes, and are currently in decline due to the extinction of Pleistocene megafauna. In Europe, evidence from the pollen record suggests that megafauna promoted open vegetation with shifting mosaics of forest and grassland, however this hypothesis is debated. In the Yukon region of Canada, the decline of Mammuthus and Equus may have contributed to the development of woody flora. In Siberia and Beringia, the extinction of mammoths may have contributed to the expansion of Betula (birch) tree cover. In Australia, however, megafaunal extinction may not have caused significant changes in fire regimes or vegetation. Some argue that modern ecosystems can be understood by considering the effects of extinct megafauna.

Anachronistic plants 

Some extant plants have adaptations resulting from interactions with Pleistocene megafauna, including defenses against Pleistocene megaherbivores, and large fruits adapted to dispersal by megaherbivores. Such species are termed anachronistic plants. Members of the plant family Rosaceae (including Malus, apples) evolved large fruits as an adaptation to dispersal by megafaunal herbivores. Megafaunal extinction caused the decline of Cucurbita species which relied on megaherbivores for dispersal. Cucurbita fruits contain cucurbitacins, bitter compounds that are toxic to small herbivores but can be tolerated by megafauna; Cucurbita seeds have been found in fossil mastodon dung. Some argue that plant adaptations to megafauna resulted in traits that allowed for domestication. Human dispersal may have prevented the range contraction of Neotropical species with fruit formerly dispersed by megafauna.

Effects on climate 
Megafaunal extinction may have caused global cooling of the Earth's climate due to reduced methane emissions from megaherbivores and increased woody vegetation associated with reduced trampling and browsing. Smith et al. suggest that megafaunal extinctions in the Americas contributed to the Younger Dryas cooling event.

Extinction causes 

Four theories have been advanced as likely causes of these extinctions: hunting by the spreading humans (or overkill hypothesis, initially developed by geoscientist Paul S. Martin), the change in climate at the end of the last glacial period, disease, and an extraterrestrial impact from an asteroid or comet. These factors are not necessarily exclusive: any or all may have combined to cause the extinctions. Of these, climate change and the overkill hypothesis have the most support, with evidence weighing towards the overkill hypothesis.

Although not mutually exclusive, which factor was more important remains contested. Where humans appeared on the scene, megafauna went extinct; but at the same time, the climate was also warming. Large body size is an adaptation to colder climes, so a warming climate would have provided a stressor for these large animals; however, many fauna simply evolved a smaller body size over time. There is overwhelming archaeological evidence that humans did indeed hunt some or many of the now extinct species, such as the mammoth in North America; while evidence of hunting is necessary for the overhunting hypothesis, it is not sufficient to prove that human hunting drove the extinctions.  The primary cause of Pleistocene megafauna extinctions may vary among regions and species (see below).

Effects and causes by continent

Africa

Background and scope

While North America was most notably impacted by the Pleistocene Megafaunal extinction, Eurasia, Africa and the Insular regions were also affected and experienced some extinction towards the end of the Pleistocene period. Megafaunal losses are poorly understood on continental Africa during both the Late Pleistocene and the Holocene periods. During the late Pleistocene and early Holocene period an estimated breadth of 24 large mammal species, of greater than 45 kg, were lost from continental Africa. These losses are best understood to have occurred between 13,000 and 6,000 years ago. The species of megafauna which were lost in continental Africa are best understood to have been grazers who lived on grasslands. However, other sources report that over 27 species were lost in the last million years. Sources vary in the breadth of the issue, however it is clear that significant biodiversity loss occurred in Africa.

Anthropogenic involvement
At sites in Africa such as Olduvai, Olorgesailie, Kariandusi, Hopefield, Islmilia, and the Vaal River gravels most genera found were found in stratigraphic association with hand tools wielded by early human ancestors. These artifacts were from Acheulean origins. Acheulean tools include handaxes made from stone. These hand tools were made with a distinctly pear shaped morphology. Homo erectus was thought to wield these hand tools for a variety of purposes. Hand axes could be used to butcher and skin game, cut, chop, scrape, cut other instruments, digging in soil, cutting wood, cutting plant material. These tools were first discovered in 1847. These handaxes have been discovered on multiple continents including Southern Africa, Northern Europe, Western Europe and the Indian sub-continent. These Acheulean tools were found to have been being produced and utilized for roughly a million years. The earliest Acheulean artifacts were discovered in Africa to have existed for over 1.6 million years ago whereas the earliest Archulean tools are thought to have existed in Europe as early as 800,000 years ago. These hand axes measure 12–20 cm long. There is notable difference in the size, quality and efficacy of these tools depending on the workmanship of the crafter.

Arguments have existed regarding whether these early humans could have contributed significantly to megafauna extinction in Africa, Eurasia, and North America utilizing stone tools such as the Archulean hand tools which have been discussed. It is important to note that these analyses are considered incomplete by many contemporary scholars. However, despite the lack of scientific consensus surrounding this theory, this is being applied to contemporary biodiversity losses.

"A growing body of literature proposes that our ancestors contributed to large mammal extinctions in Africa long before the appearance of Homo sapiens, with some arguing that premodern hominins (e.g., Homo erectus) triggered the demise of Africa's largest herbivores and the loss of carnivoran diversity. Though such arguments have been around for decades, they are now increasingly accepted by those concerned with biodiversity decline in the present-day, despite the near complete absence of critical discussion or debate. To facilitate that process, here we review ancient anthropogenic extinction hypotheses and critically examine the data underpinning them. Broadly speaking, we show that arguments made in favor of ancient anthropogenic extinctions are based on problematic data analysis and interpretation, and are substantially weakened when extinctions are considered in the context of long-term evolutionary, ecological, and environmental changes." At the present moment - according to this source, there is no definitive empirical evidence to suggest that hominins have had widespread impact on the biodiversity of Pleistocene Africa.

Other sources propose alternate hypotheses: "To our knowledge, the earliest proposal of ancient hominin impacts in Africa can be traced to J. Desmond Clark's (1959) overview of southern African prehistory. Referring to a handful of large herbivores whose last appearances in southern Africa are now known to range in age from ∼1 Ma to the onset of the Holocene (Brink et al., 2012; Faith, 2014; Klein et al., 2007), including Stylohipparion (= Eurygnathohippus cornelianus), Griquatherium (= Sivatherium maurusium), and Homoioceras (= Syncerus antiquus), Clark (1959:57) suggested that "[t]heir final extinction may well have been due to man's improved methods of hunting these overspecialized and probably clumsy beasts." Clark did not specify which hominin species was to blame, but from the evidence available to him at the time, it was clear that at least some of these extinct taxa (e.g., Stylohipparion and Griquatherium) disappeared long before the Pleistocene-Holocene transition (Clark, 1959:54) and were associated with hominins that preceded the emergence of H. sapiens, including H. heidelbergensis (Drennan, 1953)". This discussion of Megafaunal losses in Africa during the Pleistocene period would suggest that anthropogenic influence could have been a significant impetus for extinction.

Another hypothesis suggests a more environmentally focused cause for the megafaunal extinction in Pleistocene Africa, "The current lack of evidence (for hominin attributed extinction) does not preclude it from being produced in the future, though we are not optimistic that it will be. Looking to the last ∼100,000 years-a time interval encompassing massive demographic and technological change among human populations-it is clear that African megafaunal extinctions are readily explained by environmental changes (Faith, 2014). In particular, grassland herbivores disappeared following alterations in the structure, distribution, or productivity of their habitats (Faith, 2014), consistent with broader changes in herbivore community composition spanning the last 1 Myr (Faith et al., 2019)". Environmental factors implicated in this explanation include structure, distribution and biological productivity of the environment. This explanation minimizes human impact and emphasizes environmental factors.

African Pleistocene megafauna losses
Megafauna from Africa that had gone extinct during the Pleistocene included Dinopithecus, Gorgopithecus, Parapapio, Australopithecus, Paranthropus, machairodonts such as Homotherium and Megantereon, Makapania, Megalotragus and Pelorovis.

The summary of mammalian megafaunal extinction and survival can be discussed by comparing Africa and North America. Living genera (50 kg+) in Africa include 40 and 14 in the North America. Later Pleistocene extinction genera include 26+ in Africa and 35 in the US and Canada. Earlier Pleistocene extinction genera include 19 in Africa and 13 in the US and Canada. Later Pleistocene Megafaunal Extinction Intensity was 39% for Africa, and 71% for the US and Canada. It is evident through this analysis that North America underwent a more intense later Pleistocene megafaunal extinction.

Contrasting Africa's losses with North America
The rate of extinction in the Pleistocene period between Africa and North America shows striking differences. In America, an estimated 35 genera of large mammals disappeared at the end of the Rancholabrean period. Most of these animals were lost within the last 12,000 years. However, in the preceding one to two million years before the end of the Rancholabrean period, an estimated 13 genera of megafauna were lost. This may be attributed to a poor understanding of fauna that existed before to this period. To compare this rate of megafaunal loss with Africa, the differences between the earlier, middle and later Pleistocene faunal losses are less drastic to compare. In the first 1.5 million years 19 megafaunal genera were lost. Within the last 100,000 years 26 or more genera were lost. This rate of megafaunal extinction in Africa in the last 100,000 years was an estimated 20 times greater in magnitude as the losses that occurred within the preceding 1.5 million years.

Africa
Sub-Saharan Africa is the region of the world with the highest amount of Pleistocene megafauna surviving to the present day. These surviving species include the African bush elephant, African forest elephant, black rhinoceros, white rhinoceros and the hippopotamus. All of these species maintained populations in sub-Saharan Africa even after many of them were extirpated from Eurasia during the early Holocene. This means that all of the largest herbivore genera present in Pleistocene Africa are still present today. Overall, estimates as to the proportion of Africa’s Quaternary megafauna which went extinct range from 5% to 18%, much lower than for all the other continents.

Multiple reasons have been suggested by scientists as to why Africa apparently had a much milder experience during the Quaternary extinction. First, some have suggested that the Late Quaternary extinction has been comparatively less studied in Africa than in other regions. As a result of this lack of studying, there is little evidence that paleontologists are able to draw upon when trying to develop a timeline of extinctions in Sub-Saharan Africa. This hypothesis therefore also argues that further investigation into sites with Late Quaternary fossils in Sub-Saharan Africa will reveal previously-undiscovered extinct taxa of African megafauna.

Other scientists have suggested an explanation for the relative lack of extinction among Africa’s Pleistocene megafauna which follows the overkill hypothesis as the cause of the Quaternary extinction. According to this hypothesis, many of the extinctions during this time period were due to overhunting by humans who had recently migrated to their continents. In sub-Saharan Africa, the megafauna species had evolved alongside the different species of hominids present in Quaternary Africa. As a result, these species had adapted to withstand the predation pressure from humans. This meant that both humans and megafauna were able to coexist, and the high levels of extinction seen in the Americas and Australasia were not seen in Africa.

While one of the popular explanations for the Quaternary extinction is due to the changing climate of the time period, the climate of Africa has not been suggested as a potential cause. This is because of the high level of megafaunal extinction in South America during this time period. Since Sub-Saharan Africa has about the same types of climate as South America, but South America had many more extinctions of megafauna taxa, climate was not deemed by these scientists to be a sufficient cause to explain the relative lack of extinctions in Africa.

Despite the high level of continuity present in Africa’s megafauna community from the Quaternary to the Holocene period, there were several species of megafauna which did go extinct during this time period. One such species was Syncerus antiquus. This species of buffalo is theorized to either have gone extinct due to climate change, overhunting by humans, or both. It was extirpated from Sub-Saharan Africa about 12,000 years ago and became entirely extinct about 4,000 years before present. Another was the giant antelope that was very similar to a hartebeest or a wildebeest known as Megalotragus priscus. M. priscus was the last of its genus, and it died out approximately 7,500 years ago. Similarly, there was an extinct species of zebra known as the Cape zebra. The Cape zebra lived throughout Africa during the Quaternary period but went extinct by its end. The bluebuck had its range restricted changing habitats during the early Holocene period, so that by the time European settlers arrived, they were restricted to one lone population. This population was then wiped out in 1800 by habitat loss and hunting.

North America

During the American megafaunal extinction event, around 12,700 years ago, North America lost 70% of its megafauna species. 90 genera of mammals weighing over 44 kilograms became extinct. The Late Pleistocene fauna in North America included several species of ground sloths, short-faced bears, several species of tapirs, peccaries (including the long-nosed and flat-headed peccaries), the American lion, giant tortoises, Miracinonyx, the saber-toothed cat Smilodon and the scimitar-toothed cat Homotherium, dire wolves, saiga antelope, camelids such as two species of now-extinct llamas and Camelops, at least two species of bison, the stag-moose, the shrub-ox and Harlan's muskox, 14 species of pronghorn (of which 13 are now extinct), horses, mammoths and mastodons, the beautiful armadillo and the giant armadillo-like Glyptotherium, and giant beavers, as well as birds like giant condors and teratorns.

The reasons for the extinction event are still debated, but it has largely been attributed to both climate change and human-driven extinction. Humans arrived in North America between 12 and 30 thousand years ago.  There are various human impacts that could have put pressure on different megafauna species, including direct hunting and cascading trophic interactions. Some researchers attribute the extinction of megafauna to the presence of Clovis hunting, along with significant human population increases which would have increased hunting intensity and frequency, around 13,000 years ago. Contemporaneously, around 12,000 years ago, a global cooling event called the Younger Dryas (YD) occurred, which would have dramatically effected habitat area and food sources for many megafaunal species.

The role of humans, climate change, and other factors in driving megafauna extinction in North America is debated, with some scholars arguing in favor of climate change as the primary driver and others suggesting the possibility of direct and indirect human impacts.   However, it can be difficult to generalize an extinction event for the continent as a whole when the climate and human impacts varied spatially, temporally, and seasonally so it is hard to generalize what triggered the event for the entire continent. Thus, it is important to consider that the causes can significantly vary for different species and different regions of North America. The extinction of megafauna and first appearance of humans did not completely correlate across North America, meaning that each area needs to be separately considered when attempting to determine the cause of extinction. Radiocarbon dating suggests that while extinctions followed human arrival in some areas (consistent with extinction due to hunting), in other regions megafauna species disappeared before humans arrived or persisted for as long as 3000 years in the presence of humans, suggesting factors other than humans drove extinctions.  Similarly, a comparison of human vs megafauna population trends, again inferred from radiocarbon dating, found that extinctions were likely due to hunting for 3 species, from climate change for 5 species, and from a combination of hunting and climate change in one case.

Megafauna extinctions that are most consistent with human activity in North America are of the Columbian mammoth, horses and saber-toothed cat. Humans directly impacted mammoth and horse species by overhunting, while Smilodon was pushed to extinction indirectly by humans overhunting of their prey. There are two species of megafauna whose extinctions appear to have no link to human hunting, they are the Shasta ground sloth and mastodon.

Alaska
Alaska is situated in the northwesternmost part of North America. Megafauna disappeared from these higher latitudes generally earlier than the rest of North America. This means that the megafauna in the region either went extinct locally or migrated south as a result of the YD cooling event. Megafauna species disappeared from Alaska approximately 1000 to 4000 years before there was significant human presence in Alaska, indicating that their demise likely resulted from climate change.

The Great Lakes region
Megafauna species disappeared from Great Lakes Region considerably more recently than in higher latitudes, like Alaska. Additionally, the first appearances of humans were considerably earlier for this region compared to other regions in North America. Due to the overlaps of these two appearances, it has been suggested from the fossil record that humans and megafauna overlapped in the region for 7000 years. However, the presence of humans does not mean that the megafauna extinction event in the region was solely attributed to human impacts. There has been significant evidence into the cause of extinction in this area being related to the fact that both climate change and human impacts hit simultaneously.

The West/Pacific coast
The Pacific Coast was one of the region where early indigenous peoples first migrated. This is due to the fact that humans may have migrated further south from Alaska through a pathway that went along the Pacific Coast. However, there appears to have been little overlap between humans and megafauna species in these regions. One potential for this could be due to poor sampling due to sea-level rise that could have “obscured older coastal sites”.

Indigenous knowledge of Pleistocene megafauna 
Indigenous knowledge of Pleistocene megafauna has survived via oral tradition and representations such as petroglyphs.

The Cayuse people of the Pacific Northwest has oral traditions and a dance centered around a story of mammoths migrating into their land. On the Umatilla Indian Reservation, where the Cayuse people lived historically and today, two mammoth teeth were discovered during construction of a golf course.

An Osage tradition tells about a battle between mastodons and mammoths in the Great Plains region. This battle left many animals dead and after the battle was over the Osage burned the dead animals. Later, after the Osage were forceable moved to a reservation, white settlers found mastodon and mammoth bones at this site.

Throughout western North America, there are many stories of large, black-winged birds, known as thunderbirds, which interacted with indigenous people in both positive and negative ways. These stories of thunderbirds share similarities with species from the genus Teratornis, which are found throughout fossil record of the west coast.

South America

About 10,000 years ago, the landscape of South America contained numerous species of megafauna, many of which have no modern species for comparison.  South America was home to bears, saber-toothed cats, large capybaras and llamas.  Additionally, there were huge terrestrial sloths, armored glyptodonts (similar to an armadillo, but the size of a hippo), and animals similar to camels and rhinos (macrauchenids and toxodonts). These animals went extinct during the Quaternary Period and all South American mammal species larger than 100 kg were lost.  The explanation for their extinction has not been definitively answered, and is a topic of debate among scientists. Some suggest that human hunting may have been the dominant driver of megafaunal decline in South America.

The continent of South America was isolated for millions of years during the Cenozoic Period, which had a significant impact on its wildlife.  This isolation helped foster species that were not found anywhere else on Earth.  Approximately 3 million years ago, the Great American Biotic Interchange occurred due to the Isthmus of Panama, which allowed for the mixing of North and South American faunas.  The mixing of faunas created new opportunities for expansion, competition, and replacement of species.  South American wildlife in the Pleistocene varied greatly; an example is the giant ground sloth, Megatherium. The continent also had quite a few grazers and mixed feeders such as the camel-like litoptern Macrauchenia, Cuvieronius, Notiomastodon, Doedicurus, Glyptodon,  Hippidion and Toxodon. The main predators of the region were Arctotherium and Smilodon.

Eurasia

As with South America, some elements of the Eurasian megafauna were similar to those of North America. Among the most recognizable Eurasian species are the woolly mammoth, steppe mammoth, straight-tusked elephant, European hippopotamuses, aurochs, steppe bison, cave lion, cave bear, cave hyena, Homotherium, Irish elk, giant polar bears, woolly rhinoceros, Merck's rhinoceros, narrow-nosed rhinoceros, and Elasmotherium. In contrast, today the largest European land mammal is the European bison or wisent.

By the advent and proliferation of modern humans (Homo sapiens) circa 315,000 BP, the most common species of the genus Homo in Eurasia were the Denisovans and Neanderthals (fellow H. heidelbergensis descendants), and Homo erectus in Eastern Asia. Homo sapiens is the only species of the genus Homo that remains extant.

Extinction Analysis
Two major events towards the end of the Pleistocene era had ultimately impacted the species that were inhabiting Eurasia; the last glacial period and the introduction of Homo Sapiens from Old World Africa. These two events were responsible for the vastly selective and intense extinctions of the Eurasian large mammal species mentioned previously. The megafauna extinctions that occurred towards the end of the Pleistocene is believed to be largely due to human hunting and overkill. Overkill models that incorporate prey availability for Homo Sapiens have provided solid backing to that theory.

Hunters of the Upper Paleolithic had crafted tools and projectile weapons that were able to bring down prey as large as Mammoths. With the population of humans rapidly increasing, the consumption and hunting of meat grew just as rapidly.

In addition to the growing numbers of human hunters, large terrestrial mammals in Eurasia had to combat detrimental climatic changes. Northern Eurasia during the Middle and Upper Pleistocene (ca. 700000–10000 BP) was continuously facing a changing climate. The landscape and habitats of mammals saw phases ranging from extensive glaciation and cold stages to temperate climates and interglacials.

A majority of extinctions occurred during the Late glacial (ca. 15000–10000 BP) periods. This period was characterized by a major reformation of vegetation, mainly the replacement of open vegetation by forests. These changes were more profound than earlier in the Last Cold Stage and are believed to have played a critical role in the extinction of the Pleistocene megafauna.

Australia

The most recent Ice Age occurred during the Pleistocene, and caused lower global sea levels. The lower sea level revealed the entire Sahul Shelf, connecting Australia with New Guinea and Tasmania. Most literature about Australian megafauna during the Pleistocene refers to the entirety of Sahul.

Australia was characterized by marsupials, monotremes, crocodilians, testudines, monitors and numerous large flightless birds. Pleistocene Australia also supported the giant short-faced kangaroo (Procoptodon goliah), Diprotodon (a giant wombat relative), the marsupial lion (Thylacoleo carnifex), the flightless bird Genyornis, the five-meter long snake Wonambi and the giant monitor lizard Megalania. Since 450 Ka, 88 Australian megafauna species have gone extinct.

There are several hypotheses that attempt to explain why Pleistocene Australian megafauna went extinct. Most studies point to either climate change or human activity as reasons for the die off, but there is not yet a consensus among scientists about which factor had a larger impact. A scarcity of reliably dated megafaunal bone deposits has made it difficult to construct timelines for megafaunal extinctions in certain areas, leading to a divide among researches about when and how megafaunal species went extinct.

Several studies provide evidence that climate change caused megafaunal extinction during the Pleistocene in Australia. One group of researchers analyzed fossilized teeth found at Cuddie Springs in southeastern Australia. By analyzing oxygen isotopes, they measured aridity, and by analyzing carbon isotopes and dental microwear texture analysis, they assessed megafaunal diets and vegetation. During the middle Pleistocene, southeastern Australia was dominated by browsers, including fauna that consumed C4 plants. By the late Pleistocene, the C4 plant dietary component had decreased considerably. This shift may have been caused by increasingly arid conditions, which may have caused dietary restrictions. Other isotopic analyses of eggshells and wombat teeth also point to a decline of C4 vegetation after 45 Ka. This decline in C4 vegetation is coincident with increasing aridity. Increasingly arid conditions in southeastern Australia during the late Pleistocene may have stressed megafauna, and contributed to their decline.

Human activity may have caused Australian megafaunal extinction during the Pleistocene, although this idea is hotly debated. To determine whether humans caused an extinction, three criteria must be met: (1) if megafauna species went extinct before a significant climate event but after human colonization, researchers can infer that the extinction was probably caused by humans; (2) if climate change during the studied epoch was not more significant than climate change during previous epochs, then any extinctions during that time were probably not caused by climate change; and (3) if all or most megafauna was still extant when humans arrived, then it is possible that human activity caused the extinction.

Some researchers believe that humans were probably not responsible for the megafaunal extinctions in Sahul. They contribute the extinctions to climate change, and argue that most megafaunal species do not appear in the fossil record within 95 Ka of human arrival. Additionally, they claim that long-term aridification of the continent resulted in staggered losses beginning by 130 Ka, and continued range contractions and extinctions throughout the rest of the Pleistocene. Researchers who do not believe that human actions were the primary cause of Pleistocene megafaunal extinctions in Australia do not exclude anthropogenic influence entirely. One article cites evidence of human interactions with megafauna at Cuddie Springs, but further explains that humans can only be held accountable for declines in the populations of the 13% of species that can be placed at that location. They argue that it will remain futile to determine the primary cause of megafaunal extinctions. Other researchers argue that, for most species, archaeological evidence of human hunting activity is rare and questionable. The major exception to this is the giant bird, Genyornis. Between 54 and 47 Ka, distinct charring patterns on Genyornis eggshells indicate that humans heated the eggs over campfires. This time period also corresponds to the decline and extinction of Genyornis. Similar charring patterns were found on emu eggs from widespread locations, also dating to this time period. These widespread charred eggshells indicate the arrival and fast spread of humans in Sahul. Despite the evidence of interactions between humans and Genyornis, there is not much evidence to indicate that there were significant interactions between humans and other megafaunal species. Many scientists interpret this lack of evidence of interaction as evidence that humans did not cause most megafaunal extinctions in Australia.

Other researchers disagree, and argue that there is sufficient evidence to determine that human activity was the primary cause for many of the megafaunal extinctions. They argue that the lack of evidence of hunting does not indicate that hunting during the Pleistocene was negligible. Rather, archaeological evidence of hunting of animals that went extinct soon after human arrival should be negligible, even if that hunting had an ecological impact. Because humans arrived on the continent so early, the period of interaction between humans and megafauna is very small relative to the entire archaeological record of Sahul. Furthermore, hunting rates would have been highest soon after the arrival of humans, when megafaunal populations were very large. Human populations would have been small during this time, and as a result, would not be as visible in the archaeological record. Researchers who believe that human activity was the primary cause of megafaunal extinction in Australia argue that the lack of evidence should not rule out human-megafauna interactions.

Insular

Many islands had a unique megafauna that became extinct upon the arrival of humans more recently (over the last few millennia and continuing into recent centuries). These included dwarf woolly mammoths on Wrangel Island, St. Paul Island and the Channel Islands of California; giant birds in New Zealand such as the moas and Hieraaetus moorei (a giant eagle); numerous species in Madagascar: giant ground-dwelling lemurs, including Megaladapis, Palaeopropithecus and the gorilla-sized Archaeoindris, three species of hippopotamuses, two species of giant tortoises, the Voay-crocodile and the giant bird Aepyornis; five species of giant tortoises from the Mascarenes; a dwarf Stegodon on Flores and a number of other islands; land turtles and crocodiles in New Caledonia; giant flightless owls and dwarf ground sloths in the Caribbean; giant flightless geese and moa-nalo (giant flightless ducks) in Hawaii; and dwarf elephants and dwarf hippos from the Mediterranean islands. The Canary Islands were also inhabited by an endemic megafauna which are now extinct: giant lizards (Gallotia goliath), giant rats (Canariomys bravoi and Canariomys tamarani) and giant tortoises (Geochelone burchardi and Geochelone vulcanica), among others. On the California Channel Islands, it is unclear whether humans caused the extinction of pygmy mammoths (Mammuthus exilis), the only species of megafauna which inhabited the area. Mammoth populations were in decline on the Channel Islands at the time of human arrival.

See also
Holocene extinction
Megafauna
Quaternary extinction event
Pleistocene rewilding
Younger Dryas impact hypothesis

References

External links

Pleistocene extinctions